Erik Michael Coonce (August 1, 1946 – February 25, 2011), better known as Rick Coonce, was the drummer for American rock band The Grass Roots from 1966 to 1972.

Early life
Coonce was born in Los Angeles, California on August 1, 1946, at The City Of Angels Hospital. He attended a Catholic school for six years while his mother worked to support the family. His father played the fiddle and his mother sang. Coonce developed an interest in music at an early age by observing his parents and his older brother's guitar lessons, though his mother insisted he learn the accordion. He attended high school in Simi Valley and played in local bands in between working at a Sunkist Growers packing house.

Career
At age twelve, Coonce switched from guitar to drums, and he was given a used drum kit by his mother. He then gave lessons at sixteen at a music store, whose owner provided him a new drum set in exchange for monthly payments. He joined a Mexican-American group called The Beethovens, with Freddie Trujillo on lead guitar, John Sepulvada on bass, Mike Vasquez on sax and Ruben Arvizo on rhythm guitar. The band was affectionately called "four beans and a tortilla". They covered several Beatles songs, with an emphasis on achieving the harmonies of Lennon and McCartney. Coonce was strongly influenced by Mexican folk music and rock legend Ritchie Valens, with whom Coonce's older brother had been a high school classmate.

In 1966, The Beethovens played at a Battle of the Bands in Hollywood and took second place. A future bandmate, Rob Grill was a singer in one of the other competing bands that night. They actually did better than The Beethovens but were disqualified because one of their band members was a professional musician, so Coonce's group moved up in rank.

Creed Bratton and Warren Entner were in the audience that night and saw Coonce play. They called him later and asked him to join their band, The 13th Floor. Kenny Fukomoto played bass and sang in the group. Through Coonce's relationship with music store owner Herb Wall, the struggling new group was allowed access to the store's equipment. The 13th Floor played wherever they could. Eventually they put together a demo tape and sent it to Dunhill Records.

P.F. Sloan and Steve Barri heard the demos and liked them. The 13th Floor were on their way to a recording contract but met an obstacle when Kenny Fukomoto was drafted into the army. The group lacked a bass player and singer so they visited the Musician Union #69 in Hollywood. There they saw a posting for Rob Grill. Rob tried out for the open slot and was dynamite.

In 1967, the group changed their name to The Grass Roots to take advantage of prior name recognition and recorded "Let's Live For Today". The iconic song peaked at #8 on the Billboard Hot 100.  Capturing the mood of the era, "Let’s Live For Today" kicked the group into stardom.

With the help of producers like Steve Barri and pushed forward by Coonce's energetic drumming, which often emphasized the bass beat, the band evolved a unique sound. Some of the hits that continue to get airplay are "Midnight Confessions", "I'd Wait A Million Years", and "Temptation Eyes".  Coonce appeared with the group on many television programs such as American Bandstand and The Ed Sullivan Show. The Grass Roots appeared in a major motion picture starring Doris Day called With Six You Get Eggroll. Coonce also composed songs with The Grass Roots, co-authoring "Feelings" and "Get it Together" (a theme song for the ABC television show) and self composing "Truck Drivin' Man". Coonce was able to work with drummer legend Hal Blaine, who was an importance influence.

Coonce left the band in 1972 and moved to Vancouver, Canada, where he played in many local groups and recorded music in his home studio.

Coonce died of heart failure on February 25, 2011.

Discography

Singles

++- Gold Record - RIAA Certification

+++ - Composed by Italian superstar Lucio Battisti

Albums

++- Gold Record - RIAA Certification

References

External links 
 The-GrassRoots.com - official site

1946 births
2011 deaths
Songwriters from California
American rock drummers
Musicians from Los Angeles